The People's Volunteer Corps, abbreviated RELA, officially the Malaysia Volunteers Corps Department, is a paramilitary civil volunteer corps formed by the Malaysian government. Their roles include: Helping to spread awareness of the government policies to the public; To assist other government agencies in carrying out duties upon request; To conduct socio-economical as well as community-based activities and; To develop oneself as a role model for the society through various trainings and courses. 

RELA has the authority to raid suspected streets or places such as factories, restaurants or hotels, and may interrogate or detain people who do not have traveling documents, such as passports or work permits, on their person. They are also in charge of security, and are absorbed into the Malaysian Army as support groups during times of war, and are tasked with search and rescue works if needed.

On 17 March 2020, Malaysian Government announced the RELA Corps will assist the Royal Malaysian Police and Malaysian Armed Forces to enforce the Movement Control Order until the end of the COVID-19 pandemic

History 
The People's Volunteer Corps is closely related to the Home Guard that was established when the Malayan Emergency was declared in 1948, and was dissolved when the Emergency ended on 31 July 1960. Its original purpose was to oppose communist fighters, and now now acts against illegal immigrants. There are 2.8 million people in the corps, most of whom are untrained volunteers. In 2008 Rela was given charge of immigration detention centres.

Personnel

Strength 
 Current strength of RELA in terms of personnel as of 13 Nov 2017
Personnel

Ranks

Criticism 
The Human Rights Watch has called for People's Volunteer Corps to be dissolved, accusing it of violating human rights, conducting illegal raids and extortions.

According to the United Nations Human Development Report of 2009, "Migrant activists say that RELA volunteers have become vigilantes, planting evidence to justify arrests of migrants and using excessive force in their policing. The government has recently announced its intention to curb abuses and is currently looking into ways of improving RELA by providing training to its members."

References

Further reading

External links
 
 news about RELA in Aljazeera
 New York Times article about Rela
 Malaysia Bar on RELA
 UK Channel 4 - Malaysia: Refugees for Sale

Federal ministries, departments and agencies of Malaysia
Ministry of Home Affairs (Malaysia)
1972 establishments in Malaysia
Government agencies established in 1972